Timos Kavakas (born 13 December 1972) is a Greek professional football manager and former player

Career
Born in Thessaloniki, Kavakas began playing football as a defender for local side Apollon Kalamarias F.C. in the Beta Ethniki. In 1996, he signed with Kavala F.C., where he would make 43 Alpha Ethniki appearances in three seasons with the club.

Kavakas spent the remainder of his playing career in the Greek second and third divisions, playing for Leonidio F.C., Patraikos F.C. and Veria F.C.

After he retired from playing, Kavakas became a football coach. In January 2010, he was appointed manager of third-tier Veria, which he guided to promotion to the second-tier Football League. Six months later, he joined third-tier Platanias and was able to lead the club to promotion to the Football League. In July 2011, AEL 1964 FC signed him as an assistant to manager Chris Coleman. However, he returned to Platanias as manager before the 2011–12 season began. There he managed to make a stunning first round course that led to the promotion of the Cretan club in the Super League for the first time in its history. The second half of the season 2011–12 finds him in Kerkyra FC, who by that time was struggling to remain in the top league. He will also succeed this difficult mission. In the season 2012-13 Kavakas started coaching second division club Kalloni F.C., but in January 2013, he returned to the bench of AEL 1964 this time as a head coach until the end of the season. The financial problems and the failure to promote the team in the Super League, led to his withdrawal in June 2013. Days later he signed with Greek Football League club Panachaiki F.C.

References

External links

Profile at Onsports.gr
AEL 1964 Official
Kavakas in Panachaiki

1972 births
Living people
Greek footballers
Footballers from Thessaloniki
Apollon Pontou FC players
Kavala F.C. players
Leonidio F.C. players
Patraikos F.C. players
Veria F.C. players
Association football defenders
Super League Greece players
Super League Greece 2 players
Greek football managers
Veria F.C. managers
Platanias F.C. managers
A.O. Kerkyra managers
AEL Kalloni F.C. managers
Athlitiki Enosi Larissa F.C. managers
Panachaiki F.C. managers
Trikala F.C. managers
PAS Lamia 1964 managers
Panargiakos F.C. managers
AO Chania F.C. managers
Iraklis Psachna F.C. managers
Panelefsiniakos F.C. managers
Acharnaikos F.C. managers
Chalkida F.C. managers
Olympiacos Volos F.C. managers
Rodos F.C. managers
Anagennisi Giannitsa F.C. managers
O.F. Ierapetra F.C. managers
Super League Greece managers